Epilacydes scita is a species of moth of the family Erebidae. It was described by Francis Walker in 1865. It is found in Ghana, Senegal, Sierra Leone, Cameroon, the Democratic Republic of the Congo, the Gambia, Kenya, Nigeria and Tanzania.

The larvae feed on grasses.

References

 

Spilosomina
Moths described in 1865
Insects of Tanzania
Moths of Africa